John Robinson Leopold (born February 4, 1943) is an American politician who served in the state legislatures of Hawaii and Maryland and later as a county executive as a Republican. He was convicted of a common law misdemeanor-misconduct in office and served a 30-day sentence in county jail and received a fine. He resigned on February 1, 2013, and was succeeded by Laura Neuman, after a vote by the Anne Arundel County Council.

Life

John Robinson Leopold was born on February 4, 1943, in Philadelphia, Pennsylvania. In 1964 he graduated from Hamilton College with a Bachelor's degree in English. Before moving to Maryland, Leopold was the first Republican elected to the Board of Education in Hawaii, where he served two years. He was also the State Director for Planned Parenthood while in Hawaii.

On June 29, 1967, he was elected as Republican chairman of the 16th Representative District. In 1970 he was elected to the Hawaii House of Representatives and was reelected in 1972.

On January 10, 1977, Mr. Leopold was appointed by President Gerald Ford to the National Title I Advisory Committee for the Education of Disadvantaged Children. On February 25, 1991, Mr. Leopold was appointed by President George Bush to the National Council on Disability and confirmed by the United States Senate.

Leopold was elected Anne Arundel County Executive on December 4, 2006, after serving 20 years in the Maryland House of Delegates.

Misconduct in office
On March 2, 2012, Leopold was indicted on multiple counts of misconduct in office for using his county-provided police security to investigate political opponents, to remove campaign signs, and to transport him to public places to engage in sexual liaisons with women.

On March 7, 2012, David Holway, President of the International Brotherhood of Police Officers held a press conference in Annapolis to demand the immediate resignation of Leopold and the Chief of Police, James Teare.

On January 29, 2013, Leopold was suspended from office after being found guilty on two counts of misconduct in office. He was subsequently sentenced to a $100,000 fine and two years in jail, with all jail time suspended except 30 days in jail and 30 days under house arrest. He voluntarily resigned from the office of the County Executive.

In April 2019, Anne Arundel County Circuit Court denied Leopold's request to vacate his criminal conviction. Leopold based the request on the grounds that his defense attorneys represented him ineffectively, which the judge disputed in her ruling.

2018 campaign
In 2018 Leopold ran for a seat in the House of Delegates in District 31B, a two-delegate district which includes the area he previously served as a delegate. In the June 2018 Republican primary, Leopold placed third with 10% of the vote, behind Brian Chisholm (39%) and incumbent Del. Nic Kipke (43%), both of whom went on to the November 2018 general election.

Electoral history

References

External links

|-

1943 births
20th-century American politicians
21st-century American politicians
Anne Arundel County Executives
Republican Party Hawaii state senators
Living people
Maryland politicians convicted of crimes
Members of the Hawaii Board of Education
Republican Party members of the Hawaii House of Representatives
Republican Party members of the Maryland House of Delegates
Politicians from Honolulu
Politicians from Philadelphia